Craggie Hope, Tennessee is an unincorporated small rural community located on the CSX Transportation railroad (formerly the Louisville and Nashville Railroad) line from Nashville to Memphis in southern Cheatham County, Tennessee.

At the beginning of the 21st century when all incorporated Tennessee communities were required to provide the state government with 20-year "urban growth plans", the nearby community of Kingston Springs at first planned to include Craggie Hope in its "urban growth boundary".  The South Cheatham Advocate newspaper published there reported that community residents protested sufficiently at a public meeting regarding the proposed boundary that the plan to include Craggie Hope in it was abandoned.  At this time it was stated that the community had approximately 100 residents, or slightly fewer; as the community does not have any formal boundaries as it is not a census-designated place, the accuracy of such a number is debatable.

Notable places
Craggie Hope is the location of Bethany Hills, a youth camp associated with the Christian Church (Disciples of Christ). It was also previously the location of another camp, the "Fresh-Air Camp", an attempt to get inner city children, particularly those infected with or susceptible to tuberculosis, out into the more healthful country air. It has been the site of efforts to build a memorial honoring atomic veterans at its "Lovers' Leap", a scenic bluff vista over the valley of Turnbull Creek which has also been the site of serious and even fatal accidents, usually involving the abuse of alcohol.

History
According to the April 23, 1872, Nashville Republican Banner, about 1870 James Woods, son of Robert Woods, sold his land on Franklin Road in Nashville and moved to Craggie Hope.  When he moved there, it was only a thicket and he built the first house there.  By 1872 it had several dwellings, a church and school house, store and an elegant hotel, nearly completed "for the accommodation of those seeking a healthful, pleasant summer resort with as good water as the world affords," besides its being within a mile or so of Kingston Springs, a resort community in its own right.

James Woods's house on Franklin Road was burned down by the Federals sometimes before December 9, 1864.  His son, James Campbell Woods, who was a Confederate, fought in the Battle of Franklin and also the Battle of Nashville and was taken prisoner.

In the fall of 1865, James G. Wood, moved to the then-unpopulated area near Kingston Springs, Tennessee and founded Craggie Hope which would become a popular summer resort at the end of the 19th century and early 20th century.  James Woods had joined the Confederate army at 16 years of age and had served with distinction in Morton's Battery.  He was captured on Hood's retreat and taken to Camp Chase and after the war the Woods family moved from their home in Nashville and settled on the Turnbull Creek in what is now known as Craggie Hope.

The Woods and Campbell families were prominent in early Nashville's history; Wood's mother was a Campbell.  Mr. Wood's grandfather, Robert Woods, started the first bank in Nashville, and Woods and Yeatman conducted the first iron stove foundry business in Nashville.  Before moving to Nashville the Woods family had also lived in Winchester, Tennessee and their home there was likewise named "Craggie Hope" after the Campbell homestead in Scotland.  The name Craggie Hope was transferred to the new and last home on the Turnbull which had crags that looked much like the ones she knew in Scotland.   Hence, the name of Craggie Hope was given to the soon-to-be summer resort town on the Nashville, Chattanooga and St. Louis Railroad by Mrs. Elizabeth Campbell Woods in the fall of 1866.

Mr. Robert Woods, the grandfather, built one of Nashville's most famous homes, known as Belle Vue, in 1840. The home still stands today.  Today, that entire section of Nashville is now known as Bellevue and is the shopping district in Nashville closest to residents of Craggie Hope.

In the early 1870s, Mrs. Woods opened a hotel at Craggie Hope and the place soon became a summer resort for Nashvillians to escape the heat for the springs in the country.  The train depot next to the hotel made it very convenient for travelers from Nashville.  (The depot has since been torn down although pictures remain.)  She ran the hotel until her death in 1886 but it continued in operation until after the new century following her death.  A small section of the hotel with its original fireplace still exists with no hint of its former glory.  Over the years the 32-room hotel was torn down section by section during World War II for much needed framing lumber and was built into many nearby homes.  Only a small part of the original structure remains near the railroad.  Unfortunately, the vast majority of the hotels from this era either succumbed to fire or being torn down for building materials.  According to the Tennessee Archives, fewer than a dozen from the era remain standing in Tennessee.

Mr. William O. Treanor and nephew John Bell Treanor of Nashville moved to the Turnbull Valley farm in the late 1800s and found that the springs had medicinal qualities.  John began Willow Brook water company which exported hundreds of gallons of the water throughout the nation regularly.  The springs added to the resort appeal.  The Treanors were of major importance to Craggie Hope.  They purchased a tract of three thousand two hundred forty seven acres in 1885 from the Woods family.  On it they ran Treanors Mills.  One produced lumber, and the other grist from grain.  They also ran a brick yard manufacturing brick.  All six of the Treanor boys attended Montgomery Bell Academy riding the train into Nashville daily from the station at Craggie Hope.  The mill was destroyed by fire in 1952 and the old Treanor home burned during the first week of December 1955.  (Source, Nashville Banner, December 7, 1955 and Robert A. Miller, A Turnbull Trilogy, page 89, 2010.)

As a summer resort, there was the main hotel and then several picturesque and rustic cottages which housed some of Nashville's best known families.  To the left of the main hotel was the Bennett-Hunter-Baxter cottage made entirely from local chestnut wood  including the framing, siding and interior walls and woodwork. It was the summer home for the family of  Nashville city Treasurer R. A. Bennett, and the families of Paul Hunter and John Baxter.  A few cottages remain today as remnants of the once-thriving spa and resort community.  Names given to the cottages included Hearts Ease, Brookside and the Wren's Nest. Maple Shade is the best known home in Craggie Hope, although its history is a little unusual.  It is actually made of two spa-era cottages moved from nearby, circa 1915, to the present location and built on piers with a "dog trot" between them.  Although not a full-scale hotel, it did serve guests who have memories of stays there until World War II.  Cottages behind served as guest houses and one of those also still survives.   It is one of the few surviving inns left in Tennessee from that era and is in the process of being restored to be placed on the historic registry.  Its distinctive architectural feature is its "dog trot" porch design which is a large 30 foot() square breezeway porch which connects the two sides of the house under a common roof allowing for optimal summer breezes through all rooms of the house. The house still has its original board and batten siding and bead board interior walls.  It was occupied for many years by Nellie Hutton who taught at the little one-room Craggie Hope schoolhouse from 1914 to 1935.  That school house building survives as a home today.  In more recent years, Maple Shade was occupied by her sisters Georgia Hutton Treanor and her sister, Mary Sutherland.  (Source, Robert A. Miller, A Turnbull Trilogy, page 87, 2010.)

Georgie Hutton Treanor and her sister, Mary Sutherland, were featured in a  March 14, 1984, Tennessean newspaper article recalling the glory days of Craggie Hope as a resort town.  Locals recall how they lived in three contiguous properties, and one sister always stayed on "the hill" at all times, even if it meant not attending the funeral of the other.  It was important that they never leave Maple Shade. (All three homes are being restored to preserve some of the historical integrity of the community).   The sisters were also known for making sure that each child in the community received a toy at Christmas each year.  The Tennessean article also mentions the John W. Thomas Fresh Air Camp, which at one time was directed by well-known Nashville social worker Fannie Battle and played an important role in the history of Craggie Hope Road.  Children from Nashville slums were brought there by train to enjoy the countryside and fresh air it provided.  A boys' dorm was built in 1909, and a girls' dorm soon followed. (Source, Robert A. Miller, A Turnbull Trilogy).  After the Great Depression it went through a series of private owners, and in 1944 it was purchased by the Christian Churches of Tennessee and today operates as the Bethany Hills Camp. The article further mentions the picturesque United Methodist Church built in 1909 which has been the setting for many film and video projects frequently aired on national television.

Below the hill and down the railroad from the old hotel was the McLean Cottage, owned by Nashville stove manufacturer I. F. McLean of the Arcade on 4th Avenue, Nashville. There was also "The Pines"  cottage of Dr. Van Sanders.  Across the street from the hotel on hill was the largest of the summer homes, the Cheek Cottage, belonging to Mr and Mrs. Joel Cheek of the Maxwell House Coffee fortune.  Other cottages belonging to familiar Nashville names included those occupied by Alex, Erwin and Dillard Goodpasture, T. W. Moore and family, Mrs. Will Trousdale, Mrs. John Webber and Mr. and Mrs. Frank Davis.

Background
http://state.tn.us/tsla/exhibits/tnresorts/aftermath.htm

References

The Tennessean March 14, 1984

External links
 hometownlocator.com

Unincorporated communities in Cheatham County, Tennessee
Unincorporated communities in Tennessee